The Cumberland Plateau salamander (Plethodon kentucki) is a species of salamander in the family Plethodontidae. It is endemic to the Cumberland Plateau, the southeastern United States. Its natural habitat is temperate forests. It is threatened by habitat loss.

Description
A medium to large sized terrestrial Plethodontid salamander which is similar in appearance and life history to the Northern slimy salamander, which it is sympatric with. The Cumberland plateau salamander was first described in 1951, but the validity of the species was questioned in 1955 until it was validated in 1983. This species likely hybridizes with Plethodon glutinosus; hybridization is common with other members of the slimy salamander complex.

Distribution
Found in the Cumberland plateau in eastern Kentucky, western West Virginia, northern Tennessee and western Virginia, the species is not found east of the Kanawha and New rivers.

References

Plethodon
Amphibians of the United States
Endemic fauna of the Southeastern United States
Amphibians described in 1951
Taxa named by Myron Budd Mittleman
Taxonomy articles created by Polbot